Andrew Moir may refer to:

 Andrew Moir (anatomist) (1806–1844), Scottish anatomist linked to a body-snatching scandal
 Andrew Moir (filmmaker), Canadian documentary filmmaker
 Andrew Moir (footballer) (born 1959), Australian rules footballer